Nagel can refer to:

 Nagel (surname), a surname and people with that surname
 Nagel, Bavaria, a town in the district of Wunsiedel, Bavaria, Germany

See also
 Nagel point, a geometric center of a triangle
 Nagle (disambiguation)

es:Clavo
ja:ネイル
yi:נאגל